The 1999 Welsh local elections,  were held on 6 May in 22 local authorities, as part of the wider 1999 UK local elections.

Wales-Wide Results

Result

In all 22 Welsh councils the whole of the council was up for election.

References

 
Welsh local elections
Welsh
1999
Welsh local elections